Philip Zwiener (born 23 July 1985) is a former German professional basketball player who lasted played for Baskets Akademie Weser-Ems/Oldenburger TB of the German ProB.

German national team
Zwiener was also a member of the Germany national basketball team at the FIBA World Olympic Qualifying Tournament 2008 and 2008 Summer Olympics.

References

1985 births
Living people
Alba Berlin players
Basketball players at the 2008 Summer Olympics
Eisbären Bremerhaven players
EWE Baskets Oldenburg players
German men's basketball players
Olympic basketball players of Germany
Small forwards
People from Rotenburg an der Wümme
Sportspeople from Lower Saxony